is a Japanese football player. He plays for YSCC Yokohama.

Club statistics
Updated to 20 February 2020.

References

External links
Profile at YSCC Yokohama

1993 births
Living people
Toin University of Yokohama alumni
Association football people from Kanagawa Prefecture
Japanese footballers
J3 League players
YSCC Yokohama players
Association football midfielders